Ilchi mosque is a historical mosque in Isfahan, Iran. The founder of this small and simple mosque was Saheb Soltan Beigom, the daughter of a courtier in the Shah Suleiman's court. The word Ilchi (elçi) means messenger in Azeri. The mosque was built in 1686 under the supervision of Mohammad Ali ben Ostad ALibeyk.

See also 
 List of the historical structures in the Isfahan province

References 

Mosques in Isfahan
Religious buildings and structures completed in 1686